Daulatabad  is a village and gram panchayat, with a police station, in the Berhampore CD block in the Berhampore subdivision of Murshidabad district in the state of West Bengal, India.

Geography

Location

Area overview
The area shown in the map alongside, covering Berhampore and Kandi subdivisions, is spread across both the natural physiographic regions of the district, Rarh and Bagri. The headquarters of Murshidabad district, Berhampore, is in this area. The entire area is overwhelmingly rural with over 80% of the population living in the rural areas.

Note: The map alongside presents some of the notable locations in the subdivisions. All places marked in the map are linked in the larger full screen map.

Demographics
According to the 2011 Census of India, Daulatabad had a total population of 5,761, of which 2,967 (52%) were males and 2,794 (48%) were females. Population in the age range 0–6 years was 641. The total number of literate persons in Daulatabad was 3,844 (75.08% of the population over 6 years).

Civic administration

Police station
Daulatabad police station has jurisdiction over a part of Berhampore CD block.

Transport
State Highway 11, running from Mahammad Bazar (in Birbhum district) to Ranaghat (in Nadia district) passes through Daulatabad. This section is locally popular as Baharampur-Jalangi Road. Daulatabad is connected to Berhampore by SH11.The main way of transportation is by road.

References

Villages in Murshidabad district